Café Rimon is a kosher restaurant chain in Israel with three locations in Jerusalem, and a fourth one located in Beit Shemesh.

History
Café Rimon opened their first location in 1953 near Ben Yehuda Street in Jerusalem.

Originally, Café Rimon was a meat restaurant, but in 1983 it switched to dairy. In 2007 they added Rimon Bistro to their Ben Yehuda location, serving as their meat restaurant, in addition to opening their second dairy location in Jerusalem. In 2014 they opened another location in Beit Shemesh.

The owner Ronen Rimon, proudly employees both Jews and Arabs at his restaurants, despite being the subject of multiple terror attacks.

Locations
 Café Rimon Ben Yehuda is their flagship restaurant located on Luntz Street. This dairy location offers a variety of food including soup, salad, pizza, pasta and fish.
 Rimon Bistro, which opened in 2007, is on Luntz Street and is attached to the Café Rimon Ben Yehuda location. Rimon Bistro is a steak house which offers a wide variety of meat options.
 Café Rimon Mamilla, Rimon's third location, opened in 2007, with the opening of the Mamilla Mall. This is their second dairy restaurant and is known for their large brunch buffets.
 Café Rimon Beit Shemesh, opened in 2014, is located in the Big Fashion Mall in Beit Shemesh.

Terror Attacks

2001 Suicide Bombings
On 1 December 2001 at 23:30, two suicide bombers positioned themselves at either side of Café Rimon and blew themselves up simultaneously, killing 10 and injuring 170. Palestinian President Yasser Arafat immediately condemned the attack. Additionally he called for an end to all suicide bombings and acts of terror against Israel.

Poisoning Plot
In 2002 Jerusalem Police and Shin Bet arrested three East Jerusalem residents who were planning to poison Café Rimon patrons. Working with Hamas, they developed a poison that would be tasteless and would induce a heart attack approximately fifteen hours later. The perpetrators were:

 Sufian Bakri Abadi, age 23, head of the group.
 Utman Said Kianyah, age 23, had been a chef at the restaurant for three years.
 Moussa Nasser, age 22, helped design the poison.

All three were sentenced to 5–10 years in prison.

See also
 Israeli cuisine
 List of restaurants in Israel

References

External links
Cafe Rimon (Hebrew Website)

Food and drink companies of Israel
Restaurant chains in Israel
1953 establishments in Israel